Vellakal Palaniapa Subramania Mudaliar (August 14, 1857 – October 12, 1946) was a translator who translated books on veterinary diseases from English to Tamil. He studied Tamil and English at Tirunelveli mission school in Tamil Nadu and at Christian college and veterinary from Govt. veterinary college, graduating in 1884 GMAC.

He was given the title of Rao Shaib by King George V in 1926 for the best performer.

References
 The history of V P Subramaia Mudaliar by V.P Chinnammal Anni

19th-century Indian translators
20th-century Indian translators
1946 deaths
1857 births